Chami Murmu (born c. 1973) is an Indian environmental activist and is known for planting trees in India. She had planted 2,500,000 trees in India till she was awarded the Nari Shakti Puraskar in 2019.

Biography
Murmu was born about 1973, she is from Bagraisai village in Rajnagar block of the Seraikela Kharsawan district.

In about 1996, Murmu began to plant trees. Over the next 24 years she was involved with planting 2.5 million trees. These trees are saplings around her village that are required to replace trees that have been felled by "mafia". They are working despite the troubles with Naxalites. In 2020 she was the secretary from an organisation, Sahayogi Mahila Bagraisai, that champions her work and it has 3,000 members

In March 2020 Murmu was in New Delhi on International Women's Day where the President Kovind presented twelve Nari Shakti Puraskar awards and Murmu was one of those chosen. Later that month Murmu announced that she and Jamuna Tudu were to join forces to protect Jharkhand's forests. They were called "the Lady Tarzans" in the press. Jamuna Tuda has 300 members in her organisation and together they hope to find more synergy.

Awards
 Indira Priyadarshini Vrikshamitra Awards, 1996
 Nari Shakti Puraskar, 2019

References

1970s births
Living people
People from Seraikela Kharsawan district
Nari Shakti Puraskar winners